Colville Lake may refer to:

Colville Lake (Northwest Territories), a lake in the Northwest Territories, Canada
Colville Lake, Northwest Territories, a community located on the lake
Colville Lake/Tommy Kochon Aerodrome that serves the community
Colville Lake Water Aerodrome, on the lake near the community